The  (Ense3) (National Graduate School of Energy, Water, and the Environment) is one of the engineering schools<ref>Grenoble-INP Institut National Polytechnique de Grenoble (The Grenoble Institute of Technology) is composed of six (6) schools: Ense3, École nationale supérieure d'informatique et de mathématiques appliquées de Grenoble or Ensimag, École nationale supérieure d'ingénieurs des systèmes avancés et réseaux or Esisar, École nationale supérieure de génie industriel or Génie industriel, École internationale du papier, de la communication imprimée et des biomatériaux or '', and finally, École nationale supérieure de physique, électronique et matériaux or .</ref> of the .

 History 
ENSIEG was created in 1908 to provide training for industrial electricians. ENSHM was later founded in 1929 to satisfy the demands of the local industries in Grenoble for graduating engineers in fluid mechanics and hydroelectricity. The two schools merged to establish Ense3 in 2008. Their merger occurred during the overhaul of the Grenoble Institute of Technology (and before that ).

During President Sarkozy's '', the Ense3 radically changed residence from the Ampère (formerly belonging to ENSIEG) and Bergès (formerly of the ENSHMG) campuses to the West campus.

Academics 
The school provides engineering training in the fields of energy (production, transport, distribution and management, and information processing), water (hydraulics, hydrology, civil engineering) and environment (renewable energies, energy efficiency, geotechnical, soil pollution, and environmental water quality). An engineering degree is awarded after completion of training.

Student recruitment is either through competitive polytechnic examinations or dedicated polytechnic preparatory schools that usually last for two years. Evidence of earlier degrees obtained from other universities could also serve as a foundation for admission.

The school offers training in the following specialties: multimedia signal and image communication systems, energy systems and energy markets, hydraulic structures and environments, electric power engineering, mechanical energy, energy engineering and nuclear engineering, automatic systems and information, and product engineering.

Degrees awarded at the Ense3 are equivalent to a Master's degree. Some of the programs are:
Electrical Power Engineering
Mechanical & Energy Engineering
Engineering of Nuclear Power
Energy systems and associated markets
Hydraulics, Civil & Environmental Engineering
Automatic control, Systems and Information technology
Signal & Image Processing, Communication Systems & Multimedia
Product Design
Three programs that are mainly taught in English, according to the school's website, are: 
Master in Hydraulic Engineering
Master in Electrical Engineering for Smart grids and buildings
Master in Fluid Mechanics and Energetics

Research and industrial relations

Research laboratories 
The research led teaching staff of the school work in the following laboratories: 
 3S-R (Soils, Solids, Structures - Risks) 
  (Laboratory of Signal Processing, image and automatic) 
 G2Elab (Laboratory of Electrical Engineering and Power Electronics) 
 G-SCOP (Science for product design, optimization and management) 
 LEGI (Laboratory of Geophysical and Industrial Flows) 
 LEPMI (Laboratory of Electrochemistry and Physical Chemistry of Materials and Interfaces) 
 LTHE (Laboratory of Hydrology and Environment Transfers) 
 Rheologie Lab (material and runoff) 
 SIMAP (Science and Engineering Materials and Processes)

Competitiveness cluster 
The Tenerrdis Center, located on the school premises, was designed to develop energies for the future. It is focused on platforms of technology, de-localized energy production, and energy savings in the home, as well as electronics, signal and image processing.

See also 
 Grenoble Institute of Technology
 Ecole nationale supérieure de Physique, Electronique et Matériaux (Phelma)
 ENSIMAG
 ISF/Engineers Without Borders

References

External links 
 Grenoble Institute of Technology: official ENSE3 website
  Grenoble Institute of Technology: Laboratories + Research structures—

Energie, Eau, Environnement
Grenoble Tech ENSE3
Grenoble Tech ENSE3
Grenoble Tech ENSE3
Grenoble Tech ENSE3
Grenoble Tech ENSE3
Educational institutions established in 2008
2008 establishments in France